Mary Baker Eddy Home or Mary Baker Eddy House or similar may refer to:

 Dupee Estate-Mary Baker Eddy Home, Chestnut Hill, Newton, Massachusetts, listed on the National Register of Historic Places (NRHP)
 Mary Baker Eddy House (Lynn, Massachusetts), a U.S. National Historic Landmark and NRHP-listed
 Any others of numerous Mary Baker Eddy residences